Martine Hennequin (née de Souza, born 26 July 1973) is a Mauritian badminton player. She competed in women's singles and women's doubles at the 1992 Summer Olympics in Barcelona, and in three events at the 1996 Summer Olympics in Atlanta. She has won gold medals in three Indian Ocean Island Games editions.

References

External links

1973 births
Living people
Mauritian female badminton players
Olympic badminton players of Mauritius
Badminton players at the 1992 Summer Olympics
Badminton players at the 1996 Summer Olympics